HR 7135 is a binary star system. Despite its Flamsteed designation of 62 Serpentis, the star can be found in the equatorial constellation of Aquila, in front of a dark rift in the Milky Way near the constellation border. It is visible to the naked eye as a dim, yellow-hued point of light with an apparent visual magnitude of 5.57. The system is located 283 light years distant from the Sun, based on parallax, and is drifting further away with a radial velocity of 23 km/s.

Discovery of the binary nature of this system is credited to Canadian astronomer H. H. Plaskett in 1922. The visible component is an aging giant star with a stellar classification of G9 III, having exhausted the supply of hydrogen at its core and expanded to 10.7 times the Sun's radius. It is a red clump giant, indicating it is on the horizontal branch and is generating energy via core helium fusion. The star is 3.2 billion years old with 1.54 times the mass of the Sun. It is radiating 53 times the Sun's luminosity from its enlarged photosphere at an effective temperature of 4,666 K. The star has a very low rate of spin, with the projected rotational velocity being too small to measure.

References

G-type giants
Horizontal-branch stars
Spectroscopic binaries

Aquila (constellation)
BD+06 3978
Serpentis, 62
175515
092872
7135